The  Muscat Gate Museum  is a  museum located on Al Saidiya Street, Old Muscat, Oman.

Opened in January 2001, the museum contains displays about Oman's history from the Neolithic times to the present. It has a number of special exhibits on Muscat's water springs, the ancient wells, underground channels, the souqs, houses, mosques, harbours and forts.

References

2001 establishments in Oman
Museums established in 2001
History museums in Oman
Museums in Muscat, Oman
Old Muscat